Anthony Morrison (born March 29, 1984) is an American professional mixed martial artist. A professional since 2004, he has competed for Bellator and the WEC.

Background
Originally from North Philadelphia, Anthony Morrison began boxing at the age of 14 and also competed in high school wrestling before deciding to compete in MMA professionally.

Mixed martial arts career

Early career
Morrison made his professional debut in 2004, and compiled a record of 16-8 before being signed by the WEC.

World Extreme Cagefigthting
Morrison made his promotional debut at WEC 46 against Mike Brown. He was defeated via first-round submission.

He later returned at WEC 48 against Chad Mendes, losing via first-round submission.

Post-WEC
After picking up four wins in the regional circuit, Morrison faced Jared Gordon for the CCFC Featherweight Championship. He was defeated via first-round knockout.

Morrison last fought in 2017, losing via unanimous decision.

Mixed martial arts record

|-
|Loss
|align=center|20–12 (1)
|Cody Stevens
|Decision (unanimous)
|RFO: Big Guns 24
|
|align=center| 3
|align=center| 5:00
|Tallmadge, Ohio, United States
|
|-
|Loss
|align=center|20–11 (1)
|Jared Gordon
|KO (head kick)
|CCFC 59: Morrison vs. Gordon
|
|align=center| 1
|align=center| 1:48
|Philadelphia, Pennsylvania, United States
|For the vacant CCFC Featherweight Championship.
|-
|Win
|align=center|20–10 (1)
|Jordan Stiner
|Decision (unanimous)
|CCFC 53: Spohn vs. Anyanwu
|
|align=center| 3
|align=center| 5:00
|Philadelphia, Pennsylvania, United States
|
|-
|Win
|align=center|19–10 (1)
|Ray Wood
|Submission (guillotine choke)
|NEF: Fight Night 16
|
|align=center| 5
|align=center| 3:02
|Lewiston, Maine, United States
|
|-
|Win
|align=center|18–10 (1)
|Kenny Foster
|Decision (majority)
|Bellator 108
|
|align=center| 3
|align=center| 5:00
|Atlantic City, New Jersey, United States
|
|-
|Win
|align=center|17–10 (1)
|Jay Haas
| Submission (guillotine choke)
|CCFC 13: Gambino vs. Foster
|
|align=center|1
|align=center|3:37
|Atlantic City, New Jersey, United States
|
|-
|NC
|align=center|16–10 (1)
|Nick Gonzalez
|No Contest
|MF: Matrix Fights 2
|
|align=center|3
|align=center|1:09
|Philadelphia, Pennsylvania, United States
|
|-
|Loss
|align=center|16–10
|Chad Mendes
|Submission (guillotine choke)
|WEC 48
|
|align=center|1
|align=center|2:13
|Sacramento, California, United States
|
|-
|Loss
|align=center|16–9
|Mike Brown
|Submission (rear-naked choke)
|WEC 46
|
|align=center|1
|align=center|1:54
|Sacramento, California, United States
|
|-
|Win
|align=center|16–8
|Alvin Robinson
|TKO (submission to punches)
|ROF 36: Demolition
|
|align=center|1
|align=center|1:09
|Denver, Colorado, United States
|
|- 
|Win
|align=center|15–8
|Jeff Lentz
|Decision (unanimous) 
|ROC 27: Ring of Combat 27
|
|align=center|3
|align=center|5:00
|Atlantic City, New Jersey, United States
|
|- 
|Loss
|align=center|14–8
|Micah Miller
|Submission (arm-triangle choke) 
|Shine Fights 2: ATT vs. The World
|
|align=center|2
|align=center|4:25
|Miami, Florida, United States
|
|- 
|Win
|align=center|14–7
|Tim Troxell
|Decision (unanimous)
|WCA: Caged Combat
|
|align=center|3
|align=center|5:00
|Atlantic City, New Jersey, United States
|
|- 
|Win
|align=center|13–7
|Kevin Roddy
|Decision (unanimous)   
|WCA: Pure Combat
|
|align=center|3
|align=center|3:00
|Atlantic City, New Jersey, United States
|
|- 
|Loss
|align=center|12–7
|Fabio Mello
|Submission (guillotine choke)  
|AOF 1: Rumble at Robarts 1
|
|align=center|1
|align=center|2:17
|Sarasota, Florida, United States
|
|- 
|Win
|align=center|12–6
|Jay R. Palmer
|Submission (armbar) 
|CSC: Combat Sports Challenge
|
|align=center|2
|align=center|1:51
|Colonial Heights, Virginia, United States
|
|- 
|Win
|align=center|11–6
|Nelson Sobral
|TKO (punches)
|CSC: Combat Sports Challenge
|
|align=center|1
|align=center|1:10
|Richmond, Virginia, United States
|
|- 
|Loss
|align=center|10–6
|Eddie Fyvie
|Submission (triangle choke)
|ROC 19: Ring of Combat 19
|
|align=center|1
|align=center|3:47
|Atlantic City, New Jersey, United States
|Return to Lightweight.
|- 
|Win
|align=center|10–5
|Alvin Decker
|TKO (punches)
|CSC 24: The Proving Ground
|
|align=center|1
|align=center|2:28
|Richmond, Virginia, United States
|
|- 
|Win
|align=center|9–5
|Anthony Biondo
|TKO
|CSC: Combat Sports Challenge
|
|align=center|1
|align=center|2:08
|Richmond, Virginia, United States
|
|- 
|Loss
|align=center|8–5
|Ricardo Tirloni
|KO
|CSC: Combat Sports Challenge
|
|align=center|1
|align=center|0:40
|Richmond, Virginia, United States
|Lightweight bout.
|- 
|Win
|align=center|8–4
|Dan Swift
|Submission (kneebar)
|CSC: Combat Sports Challenge
|
|align=center|2
|align=center|4:32
|Colonial Heights, Virginia, United States
|
|- 
|Loss
|align=center|7–4
|Jim Miller
|Submission (triangle choke)   
|CCFC 5: Two Worlds, One Cage
|
|align=center|1
|align=center|4:56
|Atlantic City, New Jersey, United States
|Lightweight bout.
|- 
|Win
|align=center|7–3
|Patrick Upton
|TKO (punches)
|CSC: Combat Sports Challenge
|
|align=center|1
|align=center|2:53
|Mechanicsville, Virginia, United States
|
|- 
|Win
|align=center|6–3
|Spencer Paige
|Decision (unanimous)  
|CFFC 4: Cage Fury Fighting Championships 4
|
|align=center|3
|align=center|5:00
|Atlantic City, New Jersey, United States
|
|- 
|Win
|align=center|5–3
|Travis Worsencroft
|TKO (punches)
|CSC: Combat Sports Challenge
|
|align=center|1
|align=center|1:04
|Mechanicsville, Virginia, United States
|
|- 
|Win
|align=center|4–3
|Matt Andrews
|TKO (punches)
|CSC: River City Rumble 5 
|
|align=center|1
|align=center|3:35
|Mechanicsville, Virginia, United States
|
|- 
|Loss
|align=center|3–3
|Frank Johnson
|TKO (punches)
|IFC: Rumble on the River 2
|
|align=center|1
|align=center|2:36
|Kearney, Nebraska, United States
|
|- 
|Win
|align=center|3–2
|Aaron Steele
|KO (punch)
|IFC: Rumble on the River 2
|
|align=center|1
|align=center|0:20
|Kearney, Nebraska, United States
|Return to Featherweight.
|- 
|Loss
|align=center|2–2
|Deividas Taurosevicius
|Submission (triangle choke)
|CFFC 2: Cage Fury Fighting Championships 2
|
|align=center|1
|align=center|2:09
|Atlantic City, New Jersey, United States
|Lightweight debut.
|- 
|Win
|align=center|2–1
|Will Loushin
|TKO (punches)
|CFFC 1: Cage Fury Fighting Championships 1
|
|align=center|1
|align=center|0:57
|Atlantic City, New Jersey, United States
|
|- 
|Loss
|align=center|1–1
|Steve Hallock
|TKO 
|Dangerzone: Fight Night 13
|
|align=center|2
|align=center|1:37
|Angola, Indiana, United States
|
|- 
|Win
|align=center|1–0
|Justin Hamm
|Submission 
|Dangerzone: Fight Night 13
|
|align=center|1
|align=center|3:08
|Angola, Indiana, United States
|

References

1984 births
Living people
American male mixed martial artists
African-American mixed martial artists
Mixed martial artists from Pennsylvania
Featherweight mixed martial artists
Mixed martial artists utilizing boxing
Mixed martial artists utilizing wrestling
American male sport wrestlers
Amateur wrestlers
21st-century African-American sportspeople
20th-century African-American people